This page lists all described species of the spider family Bemmeridae accepted by the World Spider Catalog :

Atmetochilus

Atmetochilus Simon, 1887
 A. atriceps Pocock, 1900 — Myanmar
 A. fossor Simon, 1887 (type) — Myanmar
 A. koponeni Zonstein & Marusik, 2016 — Indonesia (Sumatra)
 A. lehtineni Zonstein & Marusik, 2016 — Indonesia (Sumatra)
 A. songsangchotei Kunsete & Warrit, 2020 — Thailand
 A. sumatranus Zonstein & Marusik, 2016 — Indonesia (Sumatra)

Damarchus

Damarchus Thorell, 1891
 D. assamensis Hirst, 1909 — India
 D. bifidus Gravely, 1935 — India
 D. cavernicola Abraham, 1924 — Malaysia
 D. montanus (Thorell, 1890) — Indonesia (Sumatra)
 D. oatesi Thorell, 1895 — Myanmar
 D. workmani Thorell, 1891 (type) — Singapore

Homostola

Homostola Simon, 1892
 H. abernethyi (Purcell, 1903) — South Africa
 H. pardalina (Hewitt, 1913) — South Africa
 H. reticulata (Purcell, 1902) — South Africa
 H. vulpecula Simon, 1892 (type) — South Africa
 H. zebrina Purcell, 1902 — South Africa

Spiroctenus

Spiroctenus Simon, 1889
 S. armatus Hewitt, 1913 — South Africa
 S. broomi Tucker, 1917 — South Africa
 S. cambierae (Purcell, 1902) — South Africa
 S. coeruleus Lawrence, 1952 — South Africa
 S. collinus (Pocock, 1900) — South Africa
 S. curvipes Hewitt, 1919 — South Africa
 S. exilis Lawrence, 1938 — South Africa
 S. flavopunctatus (Purcell, 1903) — South Africa
 S. fossorius (Pocock, 1900) — South Africa
 S. fuligineus (Pocock, 1902) — South Africa
 S. gooldi (Purcell, 1903) — South Africa
 S. inermis (Purcell, 1902) — South Africa
 S. latus Purcell, 1904 — South Africa
 S. lightfooti (Purcell, 1902) — South Africa
 S. lignicola Lawrence, 1937 — South Africa
 S. londinensis Hewitt, 1919 — South Africa
 S. marleyi Hewitt, 1919 — South Africa
 S. minor (Hewitt, 1913) — South Africa
 S. pallidipes Purcell, 1904 — South Africa
 S. pardalina (Simon, 1903) — South Africa
 S. pectiniger (Simon, 1903) — South Africa
 S. personatus Simon, 1889 (type) — Southern Africa
 S. pilosus Tucker, 1917 — South Africa
 S. punctatus Hewitt, 1916 — South Africa
 S. purcelli Tucker, 1917 — South Africa
 S. sagittarius (Purcell, 1902) — South Africa
 S. schreineri (Purcell, 1903) — South Africa
 S. spinipalpis Hewitt, 1919 — South Africa
 S. tricalcaratus (Purcell, 1903) — South Africa
 S. validus (Purcell, 1902) — South Africa

References

Bemmeridae